Farhadabad Union is a union of Hathazari Upazila of Chittagong District, Bangladesh.

Geography
Area of Farhadabad: .

Forhadabad Union is two part which is divided by Dhalai union
One part is located:

North: Fatikchori Upazila

East: Fatikchori Upozila

South: Dhalai Union

West: Sitakunda Upazila

Population
As of 1991 Bangladesh census, Farhadabad union has a population of 23,030 and house units 3,734.

Marketplaces and bazars
Basir Hat Bazar, Zabbar Hat, Nurali Mear Hat Bazar, Nazirhat Bazar

Education
High Schools and Madrashas

 Nazirhat collegiate High School 
 Forhadabad High School
 Mohammadia Dhakil Madrasha

Colleges
 Nazirhat university College

References

Unions of Hathazari Upazila